Deh Boneh is a village in Malfejan Rural District, in the Central District of Siahkal County, Gilan Province, Iran. At the 2006 census, its population was 353, in 109 families.

References 

Populated places in Siahkal County